Hodgetown is a baseball park in downtown Amarillo, Texas. It is the home ballpark of the Amarillo Sod Poodles, the Double-A affiliate of the Arizona Diamondbacks in the Texas League. It opened on April 8, 2019, and can seat 6,631 people. The park is named in honor of Amarillo pharmacist, businessman, philanthropist, and 26th Mayor of Amarillo Jerry Hodge. Hodgetown is the most elevated Double-A ballpark at approximately 3,600 feet above sea level.

In the ballpark's inaugural game on April 8, 2019, the Sod Poodles were defeated by the Midland RockHounds, 9–4 in 10 innings. The opener was attended by 7,175 people.

References

External links
Official Website

Minor league baseball venues
Baseball venues in Texas
Amarillo, Texas
2019 establishments in Texas
Sports venues completed in 2019
Texas League ballparks